Ab Danak (also Romanized as Āb Dānak) is a village in Qahan Rural District, Khalajastan District, Qom County, Qom Province, Iran. At the 2006 census, its population was 8, in 4 families.

References 

Populated places in Qom Province